Wellington Zoo is a  zoo in the green belt of Wellington, New Zealand.

History

Wellington Zoo was opened in 1906 by the late Prime Minister Richard Seddon after he was given a young lion – later named King Dick – by the Bostock and Wombwell's Circus. Over time the zoo was expanded and upgraded.

Historically, Wellington Zoo operated under the auspices of the Wellington City Council. However, in June 2003. the zoo became a charitable trust and is now governed by a board of six trustees, with the Wellington City Council as the principal source of funds.

1960s 

Wellington Zoo's current group of chimpanzees originate from a male named Tom and two females named Yoka and Sarah. Yoka gave birth to three daughters: Bebe in 1962, Jodie in 1977 and Jessie in 1978 while Sarah gave birth to a son, Sam, in 1977. Bebe then bred with Tom to produce two sons, Boyd in 1978 and Marty in 1987. Wellington Zoo also used to hold chimpanzee tea parties which were phased out during the early 1960s.

On 18 March 1967 a zookeeper failed to properly secure a tiger enclosure leading to the escape of two tigers named Napoleon and Josephine. The tigers were reportedly seen walking the streets in the suburb of Newtown where the zoo is located. The two animals were tracked down overnight and eventually killed after advancing aggressively toward police and a group of circus performers who were attempting to contain Josephine with a net. There was considerable public outrage at the killing of the animals particularly as Josephine had already been shot with two tranquilizer darts. Police justified their actions were necessary to ensure public safety.

1990s 
In 1990, Wellington Zoo received its first Sumatran tiger, a two-year-old male named Jambi, from Taronga Zoo. He was joined in 1992 by a two-year-old female, Toba, from Rotterdam Zoo. Toba died in 1993 and was replaced by a two-year-old female, Cantic, from Arnhem Zoo in 1994. Cantic gave birth to a litter of three cubs in 1996. The male, Rokan, remained at the zoo, while the females, Nisha and Malu, were sent to Auckland Zoo in 1998.

In 1992, three female chimpanzees were brought from Taronga Zoo, 11-year-old Cara, 9-year-old Samantha and 7-year-old Sally. Jodie gave birth to a son, Gombe, in 1993. In 1994, Cara gave birth to a daughter Chima, while Samantha gave birth to a son, Temba. In 1996, Sally gave birth to a son, Mahinga.  In 1998, Samantha gave birth to a daughter Keza, while Cara gave birth to a son, Alexis.

In 1992, two Malayan sun bears were brought from San Diego Zoo. They were originally named Stanley and Spot but were renamed Bakti and Chomel.  In May 1997, Chomel gave birth to twins which died at birth. She gave birth again in December 1997 but the cub shortly died after birth. Chomel gave birth again to male twins in April 1999. The cubs were named Arataki and Madu.

In 1998, giraffes Ricki and Tisa, had their first surviving calf, Ndoki. The male calf was sent to Hamilton Zoo the following year.

2000s 

In January 2000, a Sumatran tigress named Cantic gave birth to her second litter. The three cubs were named Jaka, Molek and Mencari and were sent to Hamilton Zoo in January 2001. In October 2001, Jambi died after eating contaminated meat. Cantic also ate the meat but recovered. His death left Wellington Zoo without a breeding male.

In January 2000, a chimpanzee, Sally, gave birth to a son named Bahati. In 2002, a chimpanzee, Josie, died of cancer, followed by the death of her elder sister Bebe in 2003.  In 2003, Cara gave birth to a son, Hasani, who died at three months of age. Sally gave birth to an unnamed son in 2005 who was euthanized after Sally rejected him. That same year, Sally's two sons, nine-year-old Mahinga, and five-year-old Bahati died following illnesses. Bahati had developed pneumonia and, for a  time before his death, was also looked after by the adult Intensive Care doctors from nearby Wellington Hospital. In 2007, Sally gave birth to a son, Beni. In 2009, Boyd and Gombe left for Monarto Zoo in Australia.

In May 2001, arrangements were made for the Malayan sun bear Madu to be sent to the National Zoo in Australia, however, he died following surgery on a broken tooth.  An autopsy revealed he had a hole in his heart. His twin, Arataki, was sent instead.  Bakti died in August 2001, leaving the zoo without a breeding male. In September 2004, a seven-year-old male named Sean was brought from Perth Zoo. He had been rescued as a cub from outside a restaurant in Cambodia by the Free the Bears Foundation.  Chomel gave birth to a female cub in September 2006, named Sasa.  At that time, Wellington Zoo was the only zoo in Australasia to successfully breed a sun bear. Chomel died in September 2009, following a stroke.

In September 2001, giraffe Tisa gave birth to her second surviving offspring, a female named Rukiya. She was transferred to Auckland Zoo in September 2002 and has had several calves there. In March 2004, Tisa gave birth to her seventh calf, and third surviving calf, a female named Zahara. She has remained at Wellington Zoo. In November 2007, the zoo's breeding male, 20-year-old Ricky, died. A new male, Seun, arrived in April 2008, from Orana Wildlife Park, where he was born in late 2006.

2010s 

In October 2010, chimpanzee Samantha gave birth to a daughter, Malika. Sally gave birth to a son, Bakari, in 2012.

In March 2012, giraffe Zahara went into labour with her first calf.  The labour did not progress and a caesarean was needed to remove the female calf, which was already dead. Zahara recovered well and is thought to breed again in the future, despite the death of a breeding male, Seun, in September 2012. The zoo, now left with Tisa and Zahara, is currently looking to import a new male giraffe or use artificial insemination on the younger female, Zahara.

In September 2012, Wellington Zoo opened a new enclosure for their Malayan sun bears, Sean and Sasa. The zoo is currently awaiting the arrival of a new male sun bear for breeding with Sasa. She is currently on a contraceptive implant to prevent breeding with her father, Sean. Sean died in December 2018 aged 22, however Sasa his daughter remains a well-loved resident at the zoo.

In August 2013, 21-year-old Sumatran tiger Cantic died. She was one of the oldest tigers in captivity. In June 2014, a 3-year-old Sumatran tigress, Senja, was brought from Mogo Zoo. She is the second cousin of Rokan so a new male will be imported later in the year.

In September 2014, Wellington Zoo opened its newest exhibit, Grassland Cats, home to the zoo's servals and newly arrived caracals, the first ones in the country for a long time (no longer held by the zoo).

In February 2019, the zoo decided to euthanize all of their four baboons, after a breakdown in their social structure which meant they were injuring themselves by fighting and were suffering from anxiety.

For 15 years Wellington Zoo's unofficial mascot was Tahi the one-legged brown kiwi until he died in June 2021.

Conservation and sustainability
Wellington Zoo is committed to the welfare of animals and wildlife both within the zoo and around the world. As well as caring for their animals, Wellington Zoo participates in breeding programs both locally and internationally, and contributes to conservation and research programs both within the zoo, around the country and even overseas.

It works cooperatively with other zoos around the world through studbook keepers, who are responsible for maintaining relevant data on a particular species within a programme to ensure genetic diversity. Wellington Zoo is a full institutional member of the Zoo and Aquarium Association (ZAA).

In addition to breeding programmes, the zoo is also involved in several community conservation projects. The Kererū Discovery Project is a cooperative effort with Zealandia: Karori Wildlife Sanctuary, Te Papa and Pukaha (Mount Bruce). This project aims to make Wellington a better place for kererū, the native wood pigeon. Places for Penguins is a cooperative effort with the Royal Forest and Bird Protection Society of New Zealand to identify and protect nesting areas used by blue penguins around Wellington coastal areas.

Interaction
A variety of talks and demonstrations are held on a day-to-day basis.

At The Nest – Te Kōhanga, visitors can observe and ask questions of the zoo veterinarians while they provide previously behind-the-scenes medical care to a wide range of animals on a daily basis.

Meet the Locals He Tuku Aroa opened in 2015 as a collaboration between landscape architects Isthmus Group and the Zoo. It took six years of planning and 18 months to build, and takes a fifth of the Zoo's footprint. It is a series of zones simulating a journey from the sea to the mountains with stops along the way at farmland and native forest and is dedicated to local fauna and conservation. The area includes Pōhutukawa Farm, where traditional farming may be observed.

Zoo capital development program
The Nest – Te Kōhanga animal hospital allows the public to watch the wildlife vets at work, narrating as they handle check-ups and surgeries and answering questions through an incorporated intercom system. More will be unfolding over the next few years, including the Asia Precinct and The Roost native bird care and breeding facility.

The Nest – Te Kōhanga
The Nest – Te Kōhanga is Wellington Zoo's latest major addition, with facilities and equipment to treat every animal resident of the zoo, except the giraffes, and is also used to treat rescued native wildlife. Each of the main surgical rooms has an open viewing gallery and a communication system, allowing staff to narrate procedures for visitors and visitors to ask questions of staff.

Animals

Amphibians
Aquatic
Axolotls
Southern bell frogs

Birds

Aquatic
Brolgas
Cape Barren geese
Little black cormorants
Little penguins
Pericanas
Parrots
Kākā
Keas
Red-fronted macaws
Red-tailed black cockatoos
Sulphur crested cockatoos
Sun conures

Pigeons
Crested pigeons
Emerald doves
Kererū
Predatory
Moreporks
Tawny frog mouths
Terrestrial
Bantams
Brown kiwis
Buff-banded rails
Emus
Helmeted guinea fowls
Himalayan monals
Ostriches

Fish
Inangas

Insects

Goliath stick insects
Honey bees

New Zealand praying mantises
Wellington tree wētās

Mammals

Carnivores
Asian small-clawed otters
Dingoes
Lions
Servals
Sumatran tigers
Tasmanian devils

Herbivores
Black and white ruffed lemurs
Black-handed spider monkeys
Brazilian agoutis
Capybaras
Eastern grey kangaroos
Giraffes
Kunekunes
Nyalas
Swamp wallabies
Tammar wallabies

Omnivores
Chimpanzees
Cotton-top tamarins
European hedgehogs
Golden lion tamarins
Malayan sun bears
Meerkats
Northern white-cheeked gibbons
Pygmy marmosets
Red pandas

Reptiles

Aquatic
Australian water dragons
Red-eared sliders
Terrestrial

Auckland green geckos
Chatham Islands skinks
Coastal bearded dragons
Common blue-tongued skinks
Common geckos
Cunningham's spiny-tailed skinks
Duvaucel's geckos
Forest geckos
Grand skinks
Green iguanas
Inland bearded dragons
Madagascan giant day geckos
Otago skinks
Sheltopusiks
Shingleback skinks
Tuataras

Spiders

Chilean rose tarantulas
Costa-rican zebra tarantulas
Goliath birdeater spiders
King baboon spiders
Mexican redknee tarantulas
Peruvian pinktoe tarantulas

Attacks
In 2006 zookeeper Bob Bennett was mauled by two lions, Malaik and Zulu, when an unlocked gate allowed them entry into the area where he was laying out their food. He was rescued by zookeepers with relatively minor injuries. The incident was also featured in an episode of Untamed and Uncut.

References

External links

Zoo
Zoos in New Zealand
Tourist attractions in Wellington City
Zoos established in 1906
1906 establishments in New Zealand